Bruno Sarpa Costa (born October 29, 1984), known as Doda, is a Brazilian football player.

References
jsgoal.jp

1984 births
Living people
Brazilian footballers
Brazilian expatriate footballers
Expatriate footballers in Japan
Expatriate footballers in Greece
J1 League players
Vegalta Sendai players
Association football forwards
Footballers from Rio de Janeiro (city)